The Church of St John the Evangelist in Westport, on the West Coast of New Zealand's South Island, is an Anglican parish church built in timber. Completed in 1924, it received a category 2 heritage listing from Heritage New Zealand in 1989.

Background
The first Church of St John the Evangelist in Westport was consecrated on 28 August 1869 by the Bishop of Nelson, Andrew Suter. However, by 1911, the church was considered to be too small, and plans were drawn up for a replacement church, designed in brick by noted ecclesiastical architect Frederick de Jersey Clere. However, World War I intervened and the scheme did not proceed. Bricks that had been purchased for the construction of the new building were sold in 1923.

Construction and architecture
The present Church of St John the Evangelist was built in 1924 on the site of the previous church. Constructed in timber with weatherboard cladding, the church is designed in a simplified Gothic revival style with minimal exterior ornament. The building features a steeply pitched gable roof, lancet windows (either singly or in groups of three), and buttresses to provide lateral stability.

Current status
On 21 September 1989, the Church of St John the Evangelist was designated as a category 2 historic place by the New Zealand Historic Places Trust (now Heritage New Zealand). The building remains in use as one of three parish churches within the Buller Anglican Parish.

References

Anglican churches in New Zealand
Heritage New Zealand Category 2 historic places in the West Coast, New Zealand
Listed churches in New Zealand
Churches completed in 1924
Westport, New Zealand